All Saints’ Church, Steetley is a  Grade I listed parish church in the Church of England in Whitwell, Derbyshire.

History
The church dates from the 12th century with elements from the 13th century. It was roofless from the 16th century until 1879 when the Revd. G. E. Mason started a restoration. It was restored in 1879–1880 by John Loughborough Pearson.

Parish status
The church is in a joint parish with
St Lawrence's Church, Whitwell

Organ
The pipe organ was installed by Cousins in 1973. A specification of the organ can be found on the National Pipe Organ Register. It has now been replaced with an electronic organ.

See also
Grade I listed churches in Derbyshire
Grade I listed buildings in Derbyshire
Listed buildings in Whitwell, Derbyshire

References

Church of England church buildings in Derbyshire
Grade I listed churches in Derbyshire